The Glossoscolecidae are a large family of earthworms (annelids) which has native representatives in South and Central America. The species Pontoscolex corethrurus has a circumtropical distribution.

They are found mostly in forest, but one species of earthworms lives primarily in coastal beach sand. The earthworms in this family can reach up to 2 m in length.

Selected genera

 Andiorrhinus
 Diaguita
 Enantiodrilus
 Eurydame
 Fimoscolex
 Glossodrilus
 Glossoscolex
 Holoscolex
 Rhigiodrilus
 Urochaeta
 Pontoscolex

References

Haplotaxida
Annelid families